Complicated Mind is the second full-length studio album by the Japanese band Doom.

Track listing

 "Complicated Mind" – 6:42  
 "Fall, Rise and..." – 5:24  
 "The Boys Dog" – 5:16  
 "Bright Light" – 4:57  
 "Slave of Heaven" – 5:52  
 "Kingdom of Silkroad" – 0:54  
 "Can't Break My...Without You" – 5:39  
 "Painted Face" – 4:44  
 "Poor Boy Condition" – 5:08  
 "Nervous Break Down" – 5:27

External links
Complicated Mind @ Encyclopaedia Metallum
Complicated Mind @ jvcmusic.co.jp (Japanese)

1988 albums
Doom (Japanese band) albums